Armenia is a country in the South Caucasus region of Eurasia.

Armenia may also refer to:

Places

Historical
 Armenian Soviet Socialist Republic (1922–1991), a former republic of USSR
 First Republic of Armenia (1918–1920)
 Kingdom of Armenia (antiquity), a kingdom from 331 BC to 428 AD
 Armenian Kingdom of Cilicia, a state along the coast of the Mediterranean around the time of the Crusades
 Armenia (East Syriac diocese), a diocese of the Church of the East

Colombia
 Armenia, Colombia, a city in Quindío Department
 Armenia, Antioquia, a municipality in Antioquia Department

United States
 Armenia, Wisconsin
 Armenia Township, Bradford County, Pennsylvania
 Little Armenia, Los Angeles
 Armenia Gardens Estates, Tampa, Florida

Honduras
 Armenia Bonito, Atlántida, Atlántida Department
 Nueva Armenia, a municipality in department of Francisco Morazán

Other places
 Armenian Highlands, a plateau in Asia sometimes known as Armenia
 Armenia, Belize, in Cayo District
 Armenia, Ecuador
 Armenia, Sonsonate, a municipality in El Salvador
 Armênia (São Paulo Metro), a station of the São Paulo Metro

Other uses
 Soviet hospital ship Armenia, sunk on November 7, 1941
 Armenia (1796 ship), a merchant vessel launched at Calcutta in 1796
 780 Armenia, a minor planet in the asteroid belt orbiting the sun
 Gruppo Editoriale Armenia, an Italian publisher founded by Giovanni Armenia
 Armenia (album), an album by Vasilis Papakonstantinou
 Armenia (media), an Armenian newspaper
 Armenia, a former gossamer-winged butterfly genus, nowadays classified in Satyrium
 "Armenia", a song on the album Zeichnungen des Patienten O. T. by Einstürzende Neubauten

See also
 Armenian (disambiguation)
 List of places named after Armenia
 Armenio, a village, former municipality and ancient city in the Larissa regional unit, Thessaly, Greece
 Amenia (disambiguation)